Charles C. Hartmann (1889–1977) was an American architect.

A number of his works are listed on the U.S. National Register of Historic Places. The include:

 Alamance Hotel, Maple Ave. and S. Main St. Burlington, NC (Hartmann, Charles)
 The Radio Building, 164 S.Main Street High Point, NC (Furniture Today)
 Atlantic Bank and Trust Company Building, 358 S. Main St. Burlington, NC (Hartmann, Charles C.)
 Central Fire Station, 318 N. Greene St. Greensboro, NC (Hartmann, Charles C.)
 James Benson Dudley Senior High School and Gymnasium, 1200 Lincoln St. Greensboro, NC Hartmann, Charles C.)
 Greensboro Senior High School, Greensboro, North Carolina
 Hillside, 301 Fisher Park Circle Greensboro, NC (Hartmann, Charles C.)
 Jefferson Standard Building, Elm and Market Sts. Greensboro, NC (Hartmann, Charles C.)
 Lexington Memorial Hospital, 111 North Carolina Ave. Lexington, NC (Hartmann, Charles Conrad)
 People's National Bank Building (Rock Hill, South Carolina)|People's National Bank Building, 131-133 E. Main St. Rock Hill, SC (Hartmann, C.C.)
 Person County Courthouse, Main St. between Aggitt and Court Sts. Roxboro, NC (Hartmann, Charles C.)
 One or more works in Agricultural and Technical College of North Carolina Historic District, E. side of Dudley St. between Bluford St. and Headen Dr. Greensboro, NC (Hartmann, Charles C.)
 One or more works in Downtown Burlington Historic District, Roughly bounded by Morehead, S. Main, Davis, S. Worth, E. Webb and Spring Sts. Burlington, NC (Hartmann, Charles)
 One or more works in Haymount Historic District (Boundary Increase), 100-200 blocks of Bradford Ave., 801 Hay St., 801, 802, 806 Arsenal Ave. Fayetteville, NC (Hartmann, Charles)
 One or more works in Market House Square District, Hay, Person, Green, and Gillespie Sts. Fayetteville, NC (Hartmann, Charles C.)
 One or more works in Palmer Memorial Institute Historic District, Along US 70 W of jct. with NC 3056 Sedalia, NC (Hartmann,  Charles C.)

References

External links 

 Guide to the Charles Hartmann Drawings 1928-1929, 1950

20th-century American architects
1889 births
1977 deaths